Prairie Green can refer to:
Prairie Green Township, Iroquois County, Illinois
Green Prairie Township, Minnesota